Ludlow is an unincorporated community in the Mojave Desert on Interstate 40, located in San Bernardino County, California, United States. The older remains of the ghost town are along historic Route 66.

History

Origins 
The community settlement dates back to 1870s. The community of Ludlow was named after William Ludlow of Southern Pacific Railroads.

In 1882, the town was founded. The town started as a water stop for the Atlantic and Pacific Railroad. Ore was found in the nearby hills, leading to the town's boom.

From 1906 to 1940 it was the southern railhead for the Tonopah and Tidewater Railroad, operated by the Pacific Coast Borax Company and bringing borax and other mining products from Death Valley and Beatty, Nevada, to long distance Santa Fe Railway lines. It also served as the northern railhead for the Ludlow and Southern Railway, a mining line that ran south to the Bagdad-Chase gold mine and the mining camp of Rochester. It operated from 1903 to 1931.

Route 66 
By the 1940s, local mining and railway activity had ceased and the town survived supplying the needs of travellers on the National Old Trails Road, renamed to become the legendary Route 66 in California. With Ludlow providing a Motor Court with bungalow cabins, the streamline moderne Ludlow Cafe, a gasoline-service garage, and shade.  They operated through the late 1960s. After Interstate 40 was built bypassing town there was little business and most residents departed, leaving ruins of empty buildings and Tamarisk trees that still stand flanking the old highway. Tourists following and exploring historic Route 66 pass through the ghost town now.

Chinese history 
A Chinese family resided in Ludlow. Lee Yim, his wife Guishee Yim, and their five children lived in Ludlow. The family operated The Desert Inn Cafe and Hotel. The family lived in the community from 1914 to 1960s.

In 1917, there was the Lee Yim Deposit near Ludlow that began mining production in 1918. It was associated to Lavic Mining District. The mine is closed and it is part of Kelso Dunes Wilderness.

Geography
To the northwest on Interstate 40 are Newberry Springs and Barstow, California. To the east on Route 66 is Amboy,  Amboy Crater, and Essex, and on Interstate 40 is Needles, California, and the Colorado River.

The Mojave National Preserve and Kelso Dunes, of the National Park Service, is to the northeast of town. To the west is Pisgah Crater in the Lavic Lake volcanic field. The Bullion Mountains are south behind the town, with the Bristol Mountains to the east and Cady Mountains to the northwest.

The Ludlow ZIP Code is 92338, and the community is in telephone area codes 442 and 760.

Climate
This area has a large amount of sunshine year round due to its stable descending air and high pressure.  According to the Köppen Climate Classification system, Ludlow has a desert climate, abbreviated "Bwh" on climate maps.

Landmarks 
This is a list of landmarks including its former structures.
 Dairy Queen
 The Desert Inn Cafe and Hotel - This was located on Main St. facing the railroad tracks. The restaurant and hotel was owned by Lee Yim and his family.
 Ludlow Cafe - It is plain box-like building that was a cafe in the 1940s. It was built of lumber salvaged from the Tonopah & Tidewater Railroad. In the 1960s, Earl and Lillian Warnix sold it to Laurel and Cameron Friend. The building withstood two fires. By 2015, the building had been reduced to rubble.
 Ludlow Cemetery - a pioneer cemetery.

Notable people 
 Harold William Knoll - CEO of the Ludlow Businesses.
 John W. Knoll - owner of several businesses including several gas stations, restaurant, motel, and Dairy Queen.
 Lucy Venus McNeill - Resident during her teenage and adult life. Her father worked for Santa Fe and the family lived in a train boxcar. She married Henry "Penny" Pendergast.
 Ma Preston - Owner of saloons and a wealthy person in the community. During WWI, she supported the war effort and bought $20,000 in Victory Bonds. In 1920, she retired and left Ludlow.
 Lee Yim - Owner of The Desert Inn Cafe and Hotel.

Media
In 2015, Ludlow was one of the filming locations for the film Sky as well as Barstow, Bombay Beach, Hinkley, Joshua Tree, Landers, Lenwood, Newberry Springs, and Victorville, California.

See also
California Route 66 Museum
Category: Mojave National Preserve
Kelso Depot – (Mojave National Preserve Visitors Center)
Western America Railroad Museum

References

External links

Barstow Route 66 "Mother Road" Museum
 Ludlow in toute66ca.org
 Lee Yim Deposit - Ludlow, California

Ghost towns in California
Ghost towns on U.S. Route 66
Populated places in the Mojave Desert
Unincorporated communities in San Bernardino County, California
Mojave National Preserve
Tonopah and Tidewater Railroad
Populated places established in 1883
1883 establishments in California
Unincorporated communities in California